A tarì (from Arabic طري ṭarī, lit. "fresh" or "newly minted money") was the Christian designation of a type of gold coin of Islamic origin minted in Sicily, Malta and Southern Italy from about 913 to the 13th century.

History
The ruba'i had been minted by the Muslims in Sicily, unlike the Muslim rulers of North Africa, who preferred the larger dinar. It became highly popular as it was smaller and therefore more convenient than the large-sized  dinar. 

The tarì were so widespread that imitations were made in Southern Italy (Amalfi and Salerno) from the mid-tenth century, which only used illegible "pseudo-Kufic" imitations of Arabic. When the Normans invaded Sicily in the 11th century, they issued tarì coins bearing legends in Arabic and Latin. Roger II of Sicily issued such coins, becoming the only Western ruler at that time to mint gold coins. Their composition was 16 carat gold (0.681 fineness) with some adjunction of silver and copper. The tarì were also produced by the Hohenstaufens and the early Angevins.

The tarì coins were generally minted from African gold obtained from Misrata or Tunis in Northern Africa in exchange for grain.

Nowadays, the tari is a subunit (1/12) of the scudo, souvenir coins issued by the Sovereign Military Order of Malta.

See also
Islamic contributions to Medieval Europe
Norman-Arab-Byzantine culture

References

Citations

Works cited 
Blanchard, Ian. Mining, Metallurgy and Minting in the Middle Ages. Franz Steiner Verlag, 2001.  Mining, Metallurgy and Minting in the Middle Ages: Asiatic supremacy, 425-1125
Cardini, Franco. Europe and Islam. Blackwell Publishing, 2001.  Europe and Islam
Grierson, Philip. Medieval European Coinage. Cambridge University Press, 1998.  Medieval European Coinage: Volume 14, South Italy, Sicily, Sardinia: With a Catalogue of the Coins in the Fitzwilliam Museum, Cambridge
Matthew, Donald, The Norman kingdom of Sicily Cambridge University Press, 1992  The Norman Kingdom of Sicily

External link

Numismatics
Currencies of Italy
Coins of the medieval Islamic world
Gold coins